The Irish National Congress is an Irish republican organisation formed in December 1989 to prepare for commemoration of the 75th anniversary of the 1916 Rising. Its members work on a non-party political, non-sectarian basis for a united Ireland, and human rights. They campaign on various other issues such as justice and peace, investigations into political deaths of nationalists and civilians in Ireland, and Irish neutrality.

Its first public meeting was held in Liberty Hall in January 1990.

The leading national artist Robert Ballagh chaired the organisation for ten years and spoke on its behalf in the media. It has made various submissions to Irish government bodies on such matters as Seanad Éireann reform and other constitutional issues.

The future TDs Mary Lou McDonald (currently, 2022, President of Sinn Féin)  and Finian McGrath (was, 2019, a Government junior Minister) both served as Leas-Chathaoirleach (Vice-Chair) in the organisation in the mid-90s. Mary Lou McDonald also chaired the organisation from 2000 to 2001. The economist and journalist Damien Kiberd and former minister Kevin Boland were also involved.
The current (2022) officers are: Chair, Paul McGuill; Vice Chair, Paddy Maguire; Secretary, Daltún Ó Ceallaigh; Treasurer, Angela O'Mahony; and Communications Officer, Tom Cooper.

The INC has also campaigned against measures such as Ireland joining the Commonwealth and visits by the British monarch to Ireland.

The INC is affiliated to the Peace and Neutrality Alliance (PANA).

The bulletin of the INC is INC News, both published in hard copy and accessible through its website. Its online periodical is the Irish Nation.

References

External links
Irish National Congress website

Political advocacy groups in Ireland
1989 establishments in Ireland
Irish republican organisations